The Page–Gilbert House is a historic home in the Hyde Park Historic District in Austin, Texas, United States. It is also a part of the Shadow Lawn Historic District, a subdivision within the Hyde Park neighborhood established by Hyde Park founder Monroe M. Shipe.

It was built in the late 19th century by its first owner, Christopher Page, a British immigrant who had worked as a stonemason in constructing the Texas State Capitol. It features a muted Victorian style with Queen Anne accents such as a pyramidal steeple roof.

The house is located at 3913 Avenue G, across from the Frank M. and Annie G. Covert House. It was added to the National Register of Historic Places in 1990.

See also
 Gilbert House (disambiguation)

Houses on the National Register of Historic Places in Texas
Houses in Austin, Texas
National Register of Historic Places in Austin, Texas
City of Austin Historic Landmarks